Group D of UEFA Euro 2012 began on 11 June 2012 and ended on 19 June 2012. The pool was made up of Ukraine, Sweden, France and England. The top two teams, England and France, progressed to the quarter-finals to play Italy and Spain respectively, while Ukraine and Sweden were eliminated from the tournament.

On the second matchday, on 15 June, the match between Ukraine and France that began at 19:00 local time was interrupted by heavy rainfall and a thunderstorm. The conditions forced the referee to suspend the game during the fifth minute, and play was only resumed 58 minutes later. UEFA therefore delayed the match between Sweden and England to kick off 15 minutes later than originally scheduled, instead beginning at 22:00 local time, to avoid the matches overlapping.

On the final matchday, on 19 June, the match between England and Ukraine featured a ghost goal by Marko Dević. In the second half, with Ukraine losing 1–0 to a Wayne Rooney goal, Dević's shot was hooked clear from behind the England goal-line by John Terry under the eyes of the additional assistant referee standing beside the goal (as confirmed by video replays). The incident reopened football's goal-line technology debate. Although in the build-up to the incident, Dević's teammate Artem Milevskyi was in an offside position when the ball was played to him, which also went unnoticed by the match officials. UEFA and its chief refereeing officer Pierluigi Collina admitted on the following day that an error had been made and that Ukraine had been denied a legitimate goal.

Teams

Notes

Standings

In the quarter-finals,
The winner of Group D, England, advanced to play the runner-up of Group C, Italy.
The runner-up of Group D, France, advanced to play the winner of Group C, Spain.

Matches

France vs England

Ukraine vs Sweden

Ukraine vs France
At 19:05 EEST, in the 5th minute, the match was interrupted due to severe weather. The match resumed at 20:02 EEST.

Sweden vs England

England vs Ukraine

Sweden vs France

Notes

References

External links
UEFA Euro 2012 Group D

Group D
Group
Group
Ukraine at UEFA Euro 2012
Sweden at UEFA Euro 2012